A relaxacon (sometimes relaxicon) is a science fiction convention which has little programming, and is unlikely to have a dealer's room, as the point of a relaxacon is the organizers can relax during the convention. It usually does not have a Guest of Honor, though often, especially when held in conjunction with a related convention, it may share a guest with the main convention.

Informal in nature, relaxacons are generally small, ranging from 50 to 200 attendees. They are often invitation or word-of-mouth only. Frequently, they are a chance for the organizers of a large convention to get together with the other organizers and relax once the convention is over, and are held a month or more after the regular convention. Some large conventions use relaxacons as a reward for volunteers, and as a way of using up leftover supplies (similar to a dead dog party). This can be seen as contributing to SMOF-ish behaviours, which some members of the fandom can find off-putting.

The first convention that was labelled as relaxacon was Midwestcon (started in 1950). However, the organizers first applied the term to the convention in 1966, according to Jack Chalker, and the term had been used in the Magazine of Fantasy and Science Fiction in 1957.

Sercon

Relaxacons are often contrasted with Sercon conventions, ones (purportedly) devoted solely to serious constructive discussion of science fiction topics. Organizers of most of those conventions sometimes described as "sercon" tend to be uncomfortable with the label, since the term originally implied a highly unfannish lack of a sense of fun and self-perspective.

References

External links
 Midwestcon—The first relaxacon, started in 1950
 DeCONpression—Ohio based relaxacon
 ConVersation—A Michigan relaxacon
 CodClave—NESFA's winter relaxacon
 Arisia Relaxacon—Arisia's summer relaxacon
 Chambanacon—Central Illinois' longest running relaxacon (since 1971)